Highway 283 (AR 283, Ark. 283, and Hwy. 283) is a designation for two north–south state highways in Southwest Arkansas. One route of  begins at Highway 7 and runs north to Highway 128 at Caney. A second route of  begins at US Highway 67 (US 67) in Friendship and runs north across Interstate 30 (I-30) to Caney Road. Both routes are maintained by the Arkansas Department of Transportation  (ARDOT).

Route description

Highway 7 to Caney
Highway 283 begins at Highway 7 in northeast Clark County near DeGray Lake Resort State Park. The route winds northeast to cross De Roche Creek and enter Hot Spring County. Continuing north, Highway 283 intersects Highway 128 at Caney, where it terminates.

Friendship
Highway 283 begins at US 67 (Malvern Road) in Friendship and runs northwest as Caney Road to the city limits. Continuing northwest, Highway 283 crosses over I-30 at exit 83. The roadway continues towards Caney as Caney Road.

Major intersections

History
The section near Caney was added to the state highway system on May 29, 1963. The Friendship to I-30 section was created on February 28, 1968; part of a batch of new state highways created to connect Interstates to the former US Routes they bypassed.

See also

References

External links

283
Transportation in Clark County, Arkansas
Transportation in Hot Spring County, Arkansas